Marghanita Laski (24 October 1915 – 6 February 1988) was an English journalist, radio panellist and novelist. She also wrote literary biography, plays and short stories, and contributed about 250,000 additions to the Oxford English Dictionary.

Personal life
Marghanita Laski was born in Manchester, England, to a prominent family of Jewish intellectuals (Neville Laski was her father, Moses Gaster her grandfather, and Harold Laski her uncle). She was educated at Lady Barn House School in Manchester and St Paul's Girls' School in Hammersmith, worked in fashion, then studied English at Somerville College, Oxford, where she was a close friend of Inez Pearn, who was later to become a novelist and marry Stephen Spender and subsequently, after a divorce, Charles Madge.

While at Oxford, she met John Eldred Howard, founder of the Cresset Press; they married in 1937. During this time, she worked as a journalist.

Laski lived at Capo Di Monte in Judge's Walk, Hampstead, North London, and in the Hertfordshire village of Abbots Langley.

Career
After her son and daughter were born, Laski began writing in earnest. Most of her output in the 1940s and 1950s was fiction. She wrote the original screenplay of the 1952 UK film It Started in Paradise and sold the film rights to a novel to John Mills: Little Boy Lost (1949), about an Englishman in search of a lost son in the ruins of post-war France. However, when the film adaptation was released in 1953, she was upset that it had been turned into a musical starring Bing Crosby. She turned towards non-fiction in the 1960s and 1970s, producing works on Charlotte Mary Yonge, Jane Austen, George Eliot and Rudyard Kipling.

In the 1960s, Laski was science fiction critic for The Observer. On 1 October 1970, The Times published Laski's controversial article about bestselling historical novelist, Georgette Heyer. Entitled "The Appeal of Georgette Heyer" it raised a storm of protest with multiple letters sent to the newspaper decrying Laski's criticism of Heyer. Laski was a member of the Annan Committee on broadcasting between 1974 and 1977. She joined the Arts Council in 1979, was elected its Vice Chair in 1982, and served as the Chair of the Literature Panel from 1980 to 1984.

Contributions to the Oxford English Dictionary (OED) 
An omnivorous reader, from 1958 she became a prolific and compulsive contributor to the Oxford English Dictionary (OED) and by 1986 had contributed about 250,000 quotations, making her (according to Ilan Stavans) "the supreme contributor, male or female, to the OED". Laski’s connection to the OED began in 1958, when Robert (Bob) Burchfield, Editor of the Supplement of the OED in the 1960s, published his second periodical desiderata list requesting the public’s aid in search for antedatings to specific vocabularies. It was to this list that Laski responded and began her time volunteering for the OED. In just her first year alone, Laski contributed 8,600 slips. Thus, Laski was, of course, mentioned in Burchfield’s first five-year report to the Oxford University Press (OUP) as one of the five outstanding figures who made significant input to the quotation files, in first place with 31,000 contributions. She was known to be fond of crime fiction, and her OED influence in particular to her interest in the works of Charlotte Yonge translated onto the novelist’s accession within the OED’s first and second editions. Laski had a compulsive habit of noting down in a small notebook any words that she thought would be useful for the OED in her readings. In fact, some of these notebooks are now preserved in the OED archives. According to Burchfield, Laski would also go through copious amounts of voluminous Edwardian catalogues for the names of domestic articles,vi scouring through magazines and books for unregistered vocabulary. In 1968, when the first volume of the Supplement was finally completed, Laski sent in a purposefully timed letter to Times Literary Supplement (TLS) expressing praise and appreciation for the Supplement to coincide with the time of its official publication. Laski was also one of the few individuals to receive a copy of that first volume of the Supplement even before its publication. 

In her 1972 letter to TLS, Laski also lamented her fear that the OED was lagging in time with the development of the English Language. She went as far as to call in a written submission to the Waldock Report or Waldock Committee, devoted to the modernization of OUP. Laski would convey her worries on how non-literary texts, which she considered a significant source of vocabulary that illuminated the history and development of the English language, were too often neglected. Her view of this matter, heavily based on her extensive historical readings, was eventually deemed quite reasonable and became an issue addressed in the OED3. Other impressive influences made by Laski include a series of articles she published in the TLS in 1968. Laski wrote about her experience reading for the OED, detailing her thought process whenever she encountered innovative vocabulary. Consequentially, these articles prompted a letter from Phillip Grove, then Editor of Webster’s International Dictionary. In Grove’s letters, he made a game-changing offer to make the quotation files of Mariam-Webster’s works available for the OED Supplement compilers. This led to an amicable relationship between Mariam-Webster and Oxford in the years to come. 

Ultimately, in the 1970s, Laski went on to work with Simpson on the Concise Oxford Dictionary of Proverbs. Together, they filled documentary gaps in the quotations of earlier texts, with Laski willing to put a pause on her word-collecting activities to focus on proverb gathering.

Broadcasting
Laski was a panellist on the popular UK BBC panel shows What's My Line? (1951–63), The Brains Trust (late 1950s), and Any Questions? (1960s).

Overall views
An avowed atheist, Laski was also a keen supporter of the Campaign for Nuclear Disarmament. Her play, The Offshore Island, is about nuclear warfare.

Critical reception
Anthony Boucher described her novella The Victorian Chaise Longue as "an admirably written book, highly skilled in its economic evocation of time, place and character – and a relentlessly terrifying one." Ecstasy: A Study of Some Secular and Religious Experiences has been compared to The Varieties of Religious Experience by William James in its importance. Tory Heaven, a counterfactual novel depicting a Britain ruled by a rigidly hierarchical Conservative dictatorship and satirising middle-class attitudes towards the Attlee ministry, was described as "wickedly amusing" by Ralph Straus of The Sunday Times, and as "an ingeniously contrived and wittily told tale" by Hugh Fausset of the Manchester Guardian: writing about the book in 2018, David Kynaston called it a "highly engaging, beautifully written novel".

Death
Laski died at Royal Brompton Hospital, London, due to a smoking-related lung problem, on 6 February 1988, aged 72. She was survived by her husband and children.

Works

Love on the Supertax (1944), comic novel
Stories of Adventure (1946)
The Patchwork Book (1946), editor
To Bed with Grand Music (1946), as Sarah Russell
Victorian Tales for Girls (1947), editor
Tory Heaven or Thunder on the Right (1948), political satire
Little Boy Lost (1949), novel
Toasted English (US edition of Tory Heaven) (1949)
Mrs Ewing, Mrs Molesworth and Mrs Hodgson Burnett (1950), biography
The Village (1952) novel, reprinted 2004 
It Started in Paradise (1952), film screenplay
The Victorian Chaise-longue (1953) novel, reprinted 1999 
The Tower (1955), short story
Apologies (1955), caricature
The Offshore Island (1959) play
Ecstasy: a Study of Some Secular and Religious Experiences (1961), psychology
A Chaplet for Charlotte Yonge (1965) editor with Georgina Battiscombe
Jane Austen and Her World (1969), literary history
God and Man (1971), with Metropolitan Anthony (Bloom) of Sourozh religion
George Eliot and Her World (1973) literary history
Kipling's English History (1974) Rudyard Kipling poems, editor
Everyday Ecstasy (1980), psychology
Ferry, the Jerusalem Cat (1983), story
From Palm to Pine: Rudyard Kipling Abroad and at Home (1987), biography
Common Ground: an Anthology (1989), editor
To Bed with Grand Music (2001) (posthumous)

References

Sources

Marghanita Laski at Persephone Books

1915 births
1988 deaths
20th-century biographers
20th-century British dramatists and playwrights
20th-century British short story writers
20th-century English novelists
Alumni of Somerville College, Oxford
British women short story writers
Campaign for Nuclear Disarmament activists
English anti–nuclear weapons activists
English atheists
English biographers
English dramatists and playwrights
English Jewish writers
English journalists
English radio presenters
English short story writers
English women journalists
Jewish atheists
Jewish women writers
People educated at St Paul's Girls' School
Women biographers